He Qigong (1898–1955) was a Chinese educator and Kuomintang politician of the Republic of China. He was born in Anqing, Anhui. He was the 16th Republic-era mayor of Beijing (called Beiping during his tenure).

Bibliography
 
 
 
1898 births
1955 deaths
Republic of China politicians from Anhui
Mayors of Beijing
Members of the Kuomintang
Educators from Anhui
People from Tongcheng, Anhui
Politicians from Anqing